The 1994 Kooyong by-election was held in the Australian electorate of Kooyong in Victoria on 19 November 1994. The by-election was triggered by the resignation of the sitting member, the Liberal Party of Australia's Andrew Peacock on 17 September 1994. The writ for the by-election was issued on 14 October 1994.

The by-election was won by Liberal Party candidate Petro Georgiou.

Results

See also
 List of Australian federal by-elections

References

Kooyong by-election
Victorian federal by-elections
Kooyong by-election , 1994
Kooyong by-election